Pennsville Township is a township in Salem County, in the U.S. state of New Jersey.  The township is named for William Penn. The township includes the state's westernmost point. As of the 2020 United States census, the township's population was 12,684, a decrease of 725 (−5.4%) from the 2010 census count of 13,409, which in turn reflected an increase of 215 (+1.6%) from the 13,194 counted in the 2000 census.

The township had the 24th-highest property tax rate in New Jersey, with an equalized rate of 4.285% in 2020, compared to 3.476% in the county as a whole and a statewide average of 2.279%.

History
Lower Penns Neck Township was formed on July 10, 1721, when Penn's Neck Township was subdivided and Upper Penns Neck Township (now Carneys Point Township) was also formed. The township was incorporated by an act of the New Jersey Legislature on February 21, 1798, as one of New Jersey's original group of 104 townships. The township was renamed Pennsville Township based on the results of a referendum held on November 2, 1965.

Geography
According to the U.S. Census Bureau, the township had a total area of 24.58 square miles (63.66 km2), including 21.27 square miles (55.08 km2) of land and 3.31 square miles (8.58 km2) of water (13.48%).

Pennsville, with a 2010 census population of 11,888,) is an unincorporated community and census-designated place (CDP) area located within Pennsville Township.

Other unincorporated communities, localities and places located partially or completely within the township include Cedar Crest, Churchtown, Central Park, Deepwater, Fort Mott, Glenside, Harrisonville, Penn Beach, and Valley Park.

Salem River flows along the township's eastern and southern boundaries.

The township borders the Salem County municipalities of Carneys Point Township, Elsinboro Township, Mannington Township, and Salem. Pennsville Township also borders a section of New Castle County, Delaware, which is one of only two points of land east of the Delaware River that are within the state of Delaware, the other being on Artificial Island in Lower Alloways Creek Township.

Demographics

2010 census

The Census Bureau's 2006–2010 American Community Survey showed that (in 2010 inflation-adjusted dollars) median household income was $58,153 (with a margin of error of +/− $4,425) and the median family income was $71,327 (+/− $6,934). Males had a median income of $53,166 (+/− $4,370) versus $42,054 (+/− $3,006) for females. The per capita income for the borough was $29,275 (+/− $1,740). About 7.0% of families and 9.8% of the population were below the poverty line, including 13.4% of those under age 18 and 5.9% of those age 65 or over.

2000 census
As of the 2000 U.S. census, there were 13,194 people, 5,317 households, and 3,711 families residing in the township. The racial makeup of the township was 96.68% White, 0.96% African American, 0.16% Native American, 0.96% Asian, 0.02% Pacific Islander, 0.39% from other races, and 0.83% from two or more races. Hispanic or Latino of any race were 1.60% of the population.

There were 5,317 households, out of which 29.7% had children under the age of 18 living with them, 55.3% were married couples living together, 10.2% had a female householder with no husband present, and 30.2% were non-families. 26.0% of all households were made up of individuals, and 11.6% had someone living alone who was 65 years of age or older. The average household size was 2.47 and the average family size was 2.98.

In the township, the population was spread out, with 23.2% under the age of 18, 7.7% from 18 to 24, 28.2% from 25 to 44, 25.4% from 45 to 64, and 15.5% who were 65 years of age or older. The median age was 39 years. For every 100 females, there were 92.4 males. For every 100 females age 18 and over there were 90.1 males.

The median income for a household in the township was $47,250, and the median income for a family was $57,340. Males had a median income of $45,523 versus $29,629 for females. The per capita income for the township was $22,717. About 3.1% of families and 4.9% of the population were below the poverty line, including 5.2% of those under age 18 and 5.1% of those age 65 or over.

Government

Local government
Pennsville Township is governed under the Township form of New Jersey municipal government, one of 141 (of the 564) municipalities in New Jersey that use this form, the second-most commonly used form of government in the state. The Township Committee is comprised of five members, who are elected directly by the voters at-large in partisan elections to serve three-year terms of office on a staggered basis, with either one or two seats coming up for election each year as part of the November general election in a three-year cycle. At an annual reorganization meeting, the Township Committee selects one of its members to serve as Mayor and another as Deputy Mayor.

, the members of the Pennsville Township committee are Mayor Robert E. McDade (R, term on committee ends December 31, 2023; term asmayor ends 2022), Deputy Mayor Marc S. Chastain (R, term on committee ends 2023; term as deputy mayor ends 2022), Jeffery B. Cook (R, 2022), Daniel J. Neu (R, 2022) and Peter E. Halter Sr. (R, 2024).

Federal, state, and county representation
Pennsville Township is located in the 2nd Congressional District and is part of New Jersey's 3rd state legislative district.

 

Salem County is governed by a five-member Board of County Commissioners who are elected at-large to serve three-year terms of office on a staggered basis, with either one or two seats coming up for election each year. At an annual reorganization meeting held in the beginning of January, the board selects a Director and a Deputy Director from among its members. , Salem County's Commissioners (with party, residence and term-end year listed in parentheses) are Director Benjamin H. Laury (R, Elmer, term as commissioner ends December 31, 2024; term as director ends 2022), 
Deputy Director Gordon J. "Mickey" Ostrum, Jr. (R, Pilesgrove Township, term as commissioner ends 2024; term as deputy director ends 2022),  
R. Scott Griscom (R, Mannington Township, 2022), Edward A. Ramsay (R, Pittsgrove Township, 2023) and
Lee R. Ware (D, Elsinboro Township, 2022). Constitutional officers elected on a countywide basis are County Clerk Dale A. Cross (R, 2024),
Sheriff Charles M. Miller (R, 2024), and Surrogate Nicki A. Burke (D, 2023).

Politics
As of March 2011, there were a total of 9,062 registered voters in Pennsville Township, of which 2,572 (28.4% vs. 30.6% countywide) were registered as Democrats, 1,797 (19.8% vs. 21.0%) were registered as Republicans and 4,686 (51.7% vs. 48.4%) were registered as Unaffiliated. There were 7 voters registered as Libertarians or Greens. Among the township's 2010 Census population, 67.6% (vs. 64.6% in Salem County) were registered to vote, including 86.5% of those ages 18 and over (vs. 84.4% countywide).

In the 2012 presidential election, Republican Mitt Romney received 53.4% of the vote (3,175 cast), ahead of Democrat Barack Obama with 44.6% (2,651 votes), and other candidates with 2.0% (116 votes), among the 5,999 ballots cast by the township's 9,285 registered voters (57 ballots were spoiled), for a turnout of 64.6%. In the 2008 presidential election, Republican John McCain received 3,204 votes (48.7% vs. 46.6% countywide), ahead of Democrat Barack Obama with 3,129 votes (47.6% vs. 50.4%) and other candidates with 153 votes (2.3% vs. 1.6%), among the 6,576 ballots cast by the township's 9,291 registered voters, for a turnout of 70.8% (vs. 71.8% in Salem County). In the 2004 presidential election, Republican George W. Bush received 3,547 votes (54.3% vs. 52.5% countywide), ahead of Democrat John Kerry with 2,859 votes (43.8% vs. 45.9%) and other candidates with 81 votes (1.2% vs. 1.0%), among the 6,528 ballots cast by the township's 9,041 registered voters, for a turnout of 72.2% (vs. 71.0% in the whole county).

In the 2013 gubernatorial election, Republican Chris Christie received 72.2% of the vote (2,848 cast), ahead of Democrat Barbara Buono with 25.5% (1,007 votes), and other candidates with 2.3% (89 votes), among the 3,979 ballots cast by the township's 9,134 registered voters (35 ballots were spoiled), for a turnout of 43.6%. In the 2009 gubernatorial election, Republican Chris Christie received 1,959 votes (46.9% vs. 46.1% countywide), ahead of Democrat Jon Corzine with 1,688 votes (40.4% vs. 39.9%), Independent Chris Daggett with 424 votes (10.1% vs. 9.7%) and other candidates with 75 votes (1.8% vs. 2.0%), among the 4,181 ballots cast by the township's 9,259 registered voters, yielding a 45.2% turnout (vs. 47.3% in the county).

Education
Students in public school for pre-kindergarten through twelfth grade attend the Pennsville School District. As of the 2021–22 school year, the district, comprised of five schools, had an enrollment of 1,809 students and 166.9 classroom teachers (on an FTE basis), for a student–teacher ratio of 10.8:1. Schools in the district (with 2020–21 enrollment data from the National Center for Education Statistics) are 
Valley Park Elementary School with 340 students in grades preK-1, 
Central Park Elementary School with 237 students in grades 2-3, 
Penn Beach Elementary School with 302 students in grades 4-5, 
Pennsville Middle School with 450 students in grades 6-8 and 
Pennsville Memorial High School with 450 students in grades 9-12.

Guardian Angels Regional School is a K-8 school that operates under the auspices of the Roman Catholic Diocese of Camden. Its PreK-3 campus is in Gibbstown while its 4-8 campus is in Paulsboro.

Transportation

Roads and highways

Pennsville houses county, state, U.S., Interstates and toll expressways, which all converge at the northern part of the township near Deepwater. The southern terminus of U.S. Route 130 is in the township. Route 49 begins at the converging point and travels south for about  through the center of town. Interstate 295 and U.S. Route 40 (multiplexed together) also pass through the north which houses Exit 1 along I-295 and which is also the Delaware Memorial Bridge that connects to the state of Delaware. In addition, the New Jersey Turnpike begins where Routes 49, 40, 130 and 295 all intersect with one another, with the creation of a roadway from Pennsville to Woodbridge Township being the initial goal when the New Jersey Turnpike Authority was created in 1948. Despite the Turnpike's southern end being in the township, Exit 1 is officially located in neighboring Carneys Point Township. The only major county road that travels through is County Road 551.

Public transportation
NJ Transit offers bus service to and from Philadelphia on the 402 route, and local service on the 468 routes.

Notable people

People who were born in, residents of, or otherwise closely associated with Pennsville Township include:
 Kenneth A. Black Jr. (1932–2019), politician who served in the New Jersey General Assembly from District 3A from 1968 to 1974
 Paul Anthony Ciancia (born ), convicted for the 2013 Los Angeles International Airport shooting
 Gene Foster (born 1942), professional football linebacker who played for the San Diego Chargers from 1965 to 1970
 Daniel Garrison (1782–1851), member of the United States House of Representatives from New Jersey from 1823 to 1827
 Thomas A. Pankok (1931–2022), politician who served in the New Jersey General Assembly from 1982 to 1986, where he represented the 3rd Legislative District
 Dave Romansky (born 1938), Olympic race walker
 Ritch Shydner (born 1951), writer, producer and actor
 Chris Widger (born 1971), Major League Baseball catcher and World Series Champion
 Mike Widger (1948–2016), linebacker who played in the Canadian Football League for the Montreal Alouettes and Ottawa Rough Riders
 Norm Willey (1927–2011), defensive lineman who played in the National Football League for the Philadelphia Eagles and then taught and coached football at Pennsville Memorial High School after retiring

References

External links

 Pennsville Township website
 Pennsville page on Salem County website
 Pennsville School District
 
 School Data for the Pennsville School District, National Center for Education Statistics

 
1721 establishments in New Jersey
Populated places established in 1721
Township form of New Jersey government
Townships in Salem County, New Jersey
New Jersey populated places on the Delaware River